The featherweight division in mixed martial arts refers to different weight classes:

The UFC's featherweight division, which groups competitors within 136–145 lb (65.8 kg)
The Shooto's featherweight division, which limits competitors to 135 lb (61.2 kg)
The ONE Championship's featherweight division, with upper limit at 
The Road FC's featherweight division, with upper limit at 144.4 lb (65.5 kg)

Ambiguity and clarification
For the sake of uniformity, most American mixed martial arts media outlets consider Featherweight competitors to be between 136 and 145 lb (60 and 66 kg).
King of the Cage (KOTC) refers to its 145 lb (66 kg) division as bantamweight whereas Shooto refers to its 143 lb (65 kg) division as lightweight. The UFC uses the Nevada definition of "featherweight".

The featherweight limit, as defined by the Nevada State Athletic Commission and the Association of Boxing Commissions is 145 lb (66 kg).

Professional champions

Current champions
These tables were last updated in August 2022. 

Men: 

Women:

Most wins in featherweight title bouts 

Note: the list includes wins in bouts for featherweight titles of major promotions (UFC, WEC, Bellator for men; UFC, Strikeforce, Invicta for women)
Note: the list includes both undisputed and interim champions
 Active title reign

Men: 

Women:

See also
List of current MMA Featherweight Champions
List of current MMA Women's Featherweight Champions
List of UFC Featherweight Champions
List of WEC Featherweight Champions (defunct)
List of Pancrase Featherweight Champions
List of Road FC Featherweight Champions

References

Mixed martial arts weight classes